A monochrome outfit is a full dress combination (usually including headwear, purse, footwears, and other accessories) that uses only variations of a single color, usually differing only in lightness and darkness.

The term may also mean a dress combination that uses only the colors black and white, for example as favored by fashion designer Coco Chanel.

See also

 Miss Monochrome, an anime character and virtual singer that dresses in black and white.

References

Clothing